The men's points race was an event at the 1988 Summer Olympics in Seoul, South Korea, for which the final was held on 24 September 1988. There were 34 participants from 34 nations, with 24 cyclists competing in the final. Each nation was limited to 1 cyclist in the event. The event was won by Dan Frost of Denmark, with Leo Peelen of the Netherlands taking silver and Marat Ganeyev of the Soviet Union bronze. It was the first medal in the men's points race for each of the three nations.

Background

This was the third appearance of the event. It was first held in 1900 and not again until 1984; after that, it was held every Summer Games until 2008 when it was removed from the programme. The women's version was held from 1996 through 2008.

Three of the 24 finalists from the 1984 Games returned: silver medalist Uwe Messerschmidt of West Germany, bronze medalist José Youshimatz of Mexico, and fifth-place finisher Juan Curuchet of Argentina. The reigning World Champion (1987) was Marat Ganeyev of the Soviet Union; Messerschmidt had been runner-up. Dan Frost of Denmark had won the World Championship in 1986. Ganeyev and Frost were favored in Seoul.

Barbados, Bolivia, Chinese Taipei, Czechoslovakia, East Germany, Hungary, Iran, Liechtenstein, Malaysia, Poland, South Korea, the Soviet Union, Spain, Trinidad and Tobago, and Venezuela each made their debut in the event. France and Italy both competed for the third time, the only nations to have competed in all three Olympic men's points races.

Competition format

The contest consisted of two rounds: semifinals and a final. The distance varied by round, with 30 kilometres in the semifinals and 50 kilometres in the final. The top 12 in each of the two semifinals advanced to the 24-man final. Placement in each race was determined first by how many laps behind the leader the cyclist was and second by how many sprint points the cyclist accumulated. That is, a cyclist with more sprint points but who was lapped once would be ranked behind a cyclist with fewer points but who had not been lapped. Sprint points could be gained only by cyclists who had not been lapped.

In the semifinals, there were 20 sprints—one every 1.5 kilometres. Points were awarded based on the position of the cyclists at the end of the sprint. Most of the sprints were worth five points for the leader, three to the second-place cyclist, two to third, and one to fourth. The 10th (halfway) and 20th (final) sprint were worth double: ten points, six, four, and two.

The final featured 30 sprints—one every 1.67 kilometres. As in the semifinals, most sprints were worth 5/3/2/1 points, with the halfway (15th) and final (30th) sprints worth 10/6/4/2.

Schedule

All times are Korea Standard Time adjusted for daylight savings (UTC+10)

Results

Semifinals

Semifinal 1

Semifinal 2

Final
Ganeyev led the scoreboard for most of the race, but near the end was lapped by Frost and Peelen. He took bronze despite having the most points. Frost had scored more between the lead pair, so took gold.

Results summary

References

External links
 Official Report

Track cycling at the 1988 Summer Olympics
Cycling at the Summer Olympics – Men's points race
Men's events at the 1988 Summer Olympics